Landscape design software is used by landscape architects, landscape designers and garden designers to create planting, softworks, groundworks and hardworks plans before constructing a landscape.

There are two levels of software available, amateur and professional. The former is usually aimed at simple visualization of a garden design, whilst the latter provides tools that allow stylistic representations of a design to be accurately labelled and dimensioned for contractors to interpret and land authorities or local government to sight and approve or otherwise. Since the advent of the personal computer, several software packages have come into existence. The main professional software being:
 Idea Spectrum's Realtime Landscaping Architect
 CS Design Software's CS Artisan
 LANDWorksCAD
 Keysoft Solutions' KeySCAPE LandCADD
 Landmark, PRO Landscape
 Structure Studio's VizTerra
 VisionScape's VirtualProperty Architect
 Visual Impact's Earthscapes
 Asuni's Lands Design

Professional landscape design software requires detailed information to be output for contract documentation, which will usually constitute drawings, specifications and reports (schedules/bills of quantity). The more sophisticated landscape design software solutions automate the process of generating reports (schedules/bills of quantity) from intelligent data in the drawing; such intelligence is usually contained within labels (annotations) which include, in the case of planting, automatic calculation routines to determine the number of individual plants based on plant spacings (centres) per area or length. When labelled areas or lengths are modified (stretched or shrunk), associated labels are recalculated at the same time as reports (schedules/bills of quantity) contained in or associated with the same drawing.

Features
Below is a list of some features provided by such software:
 Video Tutorials
 Digital Photo Import
 3-D View creation
 Plant Encyclopaedia
 Plant Selector
 Growth Zones & Hardiness Maps
 Images of Plants and Objects
 Print Shopping Lists
 Print Design
 Visualize Plant Growth
 Outdoor Lighting
 Irrigation Design
 Outdoor Furniture
 Reports/Schedules/Bills of Quantity
 Labels/Annotation
 Photorealistic Design Presentations
 Generating Quotes, Invoices, Reports, Plant Information

Notes

References

Landscape architecture